Marcel Parent may refer to:
 Marcel Parent (fencer) (born 1934), fencer from France
 Marcel Parent (politician), member of the National Assembly of Quebec